Chun Shek Estate is a public housing estate in Tai Wai, New Territories, Hong Kong near Che Kung Temple and Che Kung Temple station. It consists of four residential blocks completed in 1984.

Background
The estate was formerly known as Sha Tin Tau Estate. However, in November 1981, it was renamed as Chun Shek Estate.

Houses

Demographics
According to the 2016 by-census, Chun Shek Estate had a population of 5,324. The median age was 49.7 and the majority of residents (98.5 per cent) were of Chinese ethnicity. The average household size was 2.5 people. The median monthly household income of all households (i.e. including both economically active and inactive households) was HK$18,650.

Politics
Chun Shek Estate is located in Chun Fung constituency of the Sha Tin District Council. It is currently represented by Chandler Chan Nok-hang, who was elected in the 2019 elections.

See also

Public housing estates in Tai Wai
Lei Uk Tsuen (Sha Tin District)

References

Residential buildings completed in 1984
Public housing estates in Hong Kong
Tai Wai